The 2017 Champions League of Darts, also known as the Unibet Champions League of Darts for sponsorship purposes, was the 2nd annual staging of the tournament, organised by the Professional Darts Corporation. It took place from 16–17 September 2017 at the Motorpoint Arena Cardiff, Wales.

Phil Taylor was the defending champion after winning the first edition of the tournament against Michael van Gerwen 11–5, but lost in the semi-finals to Gary Anderson.

Mensur Suljović won his first major title, beating Anderson 11–9 in the final after already defeating him in the group stage.

Format
The eight qualifiers were be split in two groups, playing each other one time in a best of 19-legs match. The top two of each group proceeded to the semi-finals. Both semi-finals and the final were a best of 21-legs match.

Prize money

Qualifiers
The top 7 players on the PDC Order of Merit following the 2017 World Matchplay qualified. Reigning champion Phil Taylor was given a guaranteed place in the tournament, as will each future winner of the tournament. As Taylor was also one of the Top 7 players, the eighth ranked player also qualified.

  Michael van Gerwen (group stage)
  Gary Anderson (runner-up)
  Peter Wright (group stage)
  Phil Taylor (semi-finals)
  Adrian Lewis (group stage)
  Dave Chisnall (group stage)
  Mensur Suljović (winner)
  Raymond van Barneveld (semi-finals)

Results

Group stage

All matches first-to-10 (best of 19 legs)

NB: P = Played; W = Won; L = Lost; LF = Legs for; LA = Legs against; +/− = Plus/minus record, in relation to legs; Avg – 3-dart average; Pts = Points

Group A

16 September

16 September

17 September

Group B

16 September

16 September

17 September

Knockout stage

References

Champions League of Darts
Champions League of Darts
Champions League of Darts
Sports competitions in Cardiff
Champions League of Darts